Major General Emil Fred Reinhardt (October 27, 1888 – July 24, 1969) was a senior United States Army officer. He is most noted during World War II as commander of the 69th Infantry Division, which became the first American unit to come into contact with units of the Soviet Red Army.

Early life and military career

Emil Fredrich Reinhardt was born in West Bay City (now Bay City, Michigan on October 27, 1888, the son of Christoph L. Reinhardt and Seyville L. (Tomhafe) Reinhardt. He graduated from Bay City Western High School in 1906 and subsequently he attended the United States Military Academy (USMA) at West Point, New York. He graduated four years later in June 1910, at the age of 21, and was commissioned as a second lieutenant into the Infantry Branch of the United States Army. Among his fellow graduates were Ernest J. Dawley, David McCoach, Burton O. Lewis, John Millikin, Jack W. Heard, Oscar Griswold, Durward Saunders Wilson, James Muir, all of whom would, like Reinhardt, become general officers in the future.

After his graduation, Reinhardt served initially with the 26th Infantry Regiment at Fort Wayne, Michigan. Subsequent assignments included Texas City, Texas and the Philippines as a member of the 8th Infantry Regiment. He was promoted to first lieutenant in 1916 and captain in 1917.

During World War I, which the United States entered in April 1917, Reinhardt was promoted to temporary major. Recognized as an effective trainer and instructor, he did not see service overseas during the war and instead remained in the United States, where he served at Camp Fremont in California, Camp Pike in Arkansas, and Camp Hancock in Georgia, primarily as an instructor of infantry tactics and in the use of machine guns. In January 1919, just two months after the war came to an end with the signing of the Armistice with Germany, he was assigned as commander of the 41st Machine Gun Battalion at Camp Custer, Michigan. In 1919 and 1920 he also commanded the Camp Custer Convalescent Center.

Between the wars
After the war Reinhardt was assigned to the 50th Infantry Regiment. He graduated from the U.S. Army Command and General Staff School in 1923. He was assigned as Professor of Military Science and tactics at the University of Dayton and the Miami Military Institute in Ohio from 1923 to 1928. and the U.S. Army War College in 1931. He was promoted to lieutenant colonel in 1935 and colonel in 1939.

From 1934–1938, Reinhardt served as an instructor with Pennsylvania National Guard, and in 1938 was transferred to Washington, D.C. as the executive officer (XO) of the Washington Provisional Brigade.

World War II
Reinhardt then served as commander of 20th Infantry Regiment until April 1941, when he was promoted to the general officer one-star rank of brigadier general.

After his promotion, Reinhardt was appointed the assistant division commander (ADC) of the 7th Infantry Division, then under the command of Major General Charles H. White. His next assignment was at Camp Wolters, Texas, where he was appointed commanding general (CG) of the Infantry Replacement Training Center.

In 1942, after the American entry into World War II, Reinhardt attended the Divisional Commanders Course at the U.S. Army Command and General Staff School at Fort Leavenworth, Kansas and was then promoted to the two-star rank of major general on April 17, 1942 and also appointed the first CG of 76th Infantry Division.

From December 7, 1942 to December 1943, Reinhardt commanded XIII Corps.

In September 1944 he was appointed commander of the 69th Infantry Division (United States) at Camp Shelby, Mississippi. The division was sent to the Western Front in the European Theater of Operations (ETO) in December 1944 and entered combat in January 1945 when it relieved the battered 99th Division in Belgium. The division then attacked rapidly eastward, crossed the Rhine on March 27, 1945, and captured Leipzig in mid-April.

On April 25, 1945, during the Allies' rapid advance into Germany and towards the end of World War II in Europe, elements of the 69th Division reached the Elbe and became the first American unit to come into contact with the Soviet Red Army. After the end of the war the division was placed on occupation duty in Germany.

Major General Reinhardt returned to the United States in August 1945 and commanded the Infantry Replacement Training Center at Camp Robinson, Arkansas. He served in this capacity until September 30, 1946, when he retired from the military service.

Postwar
For his service during World War II, Major General Emil Reinhardt was awarded with Army Distinguished Service Medal, Bronze Star with oak leaf cluster, French Legion of Honour, Grade Officer, French Croix de Guerre 1939-1945 with Palm and Soviet Order of Suvorov, 2nd Class.

Reinhardt died in San Antonio, Texas on July 24, 1969, aged 80. He was buried at Fort Sam Houston National Cemetery together with his wife Laura Bishop Reinhardt (1887–1965).

Awards and honors
Major General Emil Reinhardt's ribbon bar:

In film
Emil F. Reinhardt was portrayed by Stephen Lang in the 2016 World War II film Beyond Valkyrie: Dawn of the 4th Reich.

References

External links
Papers of Emil F. Reinhardt, Dwight D. Eisenhower Presidential Library

|-

|-

|-

|-

1888 births
1969 deaths
People from Bay City, Michigan
United States Army generals
United States Military Academy alumni
United States Army Infantry Branch personnel
United States Army Command and General Staff College alumni
United States Army War College alumni
United States Army personnel of World War I
Burials at Fort Sam Houston National Cemetery
Recipients of the Distinguished Service Medal (US Army)
Officiers of the Légion d'honneur
Recipients of the Croix de Guerre 1939–1945 (France)
Recipients of the Order of Suvorov, 2nd class
United States Army generals of World War II
Military personnel from Michigan